Warren A. McLaughlin (January 22, 1876 – October 22, 1923) was an American Major League Baseball pitcher with the Philadelphia Phillies and Pittsburgh Pirates from 1900–1903.

He began pitching for the Phillies in July 1900, after playing for semi-pro teams in New Jersey. He spent some time with New London in the Connecticut League, before signing with Pittsburgh in September 1902. He was released in March 1903.

He died at Muhlenberg Hospital on October 22, 1923, following an operation to treat emphysema as a complication of pleurisy. He is interred in Hillside Cemetery in Scotch Plains, New Jersey.

References

External links

1876 births
1923 deaths
Major League Baseball pitchers
Baseball players from New Jersey
Philadelphia Phillies players
Pittsburgh Pirates players
Williamsport Demorest Bicycle Boys players
New London Whalers players
Springfield Ponies players
19th-century baseball players
Burials at Hillside Cemetery (Scotch Plains, New Jersey)
Deaths from emphysema
Deaths from pleurisy